Neil Davidge (born 29 June 1962) is an English record producer, songwriter, film score composer, musician, and occasional backing vocalist. Once an associate of dance producers DNA, he is best known as the long-term co-writer and producer for the music production outfit Massive Attack. In 1997, he also produced the Sunna album One Minute Science. During that time he has established a career as a film score composer including projects such as Push, Bullet Boy, Trouble the Water, and additional music for Clash of the Titans.

Artists he has worked with include Unkle, Damon Albarn, Elizabeth Fraser, Mos Def, David Bowie, and Snoop Dogg.

In 2012, he composed the soundtrack to the video game Halo 4 and recorded "The Storm That Brought Me To You" with Tina Dico and Ramin Djawadi for the Clash of the Titans soundtrack, the first vocal track for which he is credited as an artist separately from Massive Attack. In 2017, Davidge composed the critically acclaimed soundtrack for the TV series, Britannia.

Career

DNA (1989–1992) 
Davidge worked with UK duo DNA in the period between 1989 and 1992, co-producing four singles and one album.

Massive Attack (1995–present) 
Davidge had met Massive Attack's Andrew Vowles as early as 1991, and was in and around Bristol's Coach House Studios when Portishead recorded their debut album Dummy between 1991 and 1994.  Neil was introduced to the rest of Massive Attack in 1996, and hitting it off, he produced 'The Hunter Gets Captured by the Game', a song for the Batman Forever soundtrack that featured Everything But The Girl vocalist Tracey Thorn.

Working in close collaboration with Massive's Robert Del Naja, Neil shaped the sound of the band's third album, 1998's Mezzanine, including the song "Teardrop", which became the theme song for the medical drama "House". Mezzanine won a Q Award for Best Album and was nominated for a Mercury Award.

As with Mezzanine, Massive Attack's fourth album 100th Window was largely piloted by Davidge and Robert Del Naja. Sessions were protracted and pressurised, the group discarding material to re-write the whole record in the last six months of a three-year odyssey. "Some great things had been said about Mezzanine and we didn't want to repeat ourselves", says Neil "It was a strange period of isolation and the weirdness of 9/11, but we got there in the end."

Collected was Massive Attack's best of album released on 27 March 2006. The album was preceded by the release of the single "Live With Me" on 13 March. "Live With Me" was co-written and produced by Davidge.

Heligoland is the fifth studio album by Massive Attack. Co-produced by Davidge and Robert Del Naja with additional production by Tim Goldsworthy, the record features vocals from Horace Andy, Tunde Adebimpe, Damon Albarn, Hope Sandoval, Guy Garvey and Martina Topley-Bird. Davidge co-wrote eight of the ten tracks as well as playing keyboards, bass and guitar.

Film projects (2004–present) 
In 2004 Luc Besson approached Davidge and Robert Del Naja to score the movie Danny The Dog, later renamed Unleashed. There then followed scores for Bullet Boy, Battle in Seattle, and Trouble the Water, which received an Oscar nomination as Best Documentary Feature.  It is a moving study of those displaced by Hurricane Katrina which won 'Best Documentary' at the 2008 Sundance Film Festival. Working with Snoop Dogg, Neil also scored the music for In Prison My Whole Life, a documentary about US death-row journalist Mumia Abu-Jamal.

Away from his collaborations with Robert, Neil scored the music to the Paul McGuigan directed Push and provided additional music to the Warner Brothers film Clash of the Titans working alongside composer Ramin Djawadi. He was approached by director Louis Leterrier to replace Matt Bellamy from Muse who had to pull out due to touring commitments in the USA.

Halo 4 Original Soundtrack (2012)
On 11 April 2012, Davidge was revealed to be the composer for the Halo 4 Original Soundtrack, the official soundtrack of the video game Halo 4.

Debut Solo Album Slo Light (2014)
Davidge established his own studio in 2010. His debut solo album Slo Light was released in February 2014, and features guest vocalists such as Low Roar, Sandie Shaw and Cate Le Bon.

Discography

References

External links

 
 
 Davidge Sound on Sound Interview
 Air Edel Composer Neil Davidg

1962 births
Living people
English record producers
English electronic musicians
English songwriters
Video game composers
English film score composers
English male film score composers
Musicians from Bristol
British male songwriters